Daniel J. Flynn is an American author and columnist. He is a senior editor at The American Spectator. He has written for the Los Angeles Times, the Chicago Tribune, the Boston Globe, the New York Post, City Journal, and National Review. He lives in Massachusetts.

Flynn is a former U.S. Marine.

Books
Cult City: Jim Jones, Harvey Milk, and 10 days that shook San Francisco (ISI Books, 2018)

The War on Football: Saving America's Game (Regnery Publishing, 2013)

Blue Collar Intellectuals: When the Enlightened and the Everyman Elevated America (ISI Books, 2011)

A Conservative History of the American Left (Penguin Random House, 2008)

Intellectual Morons: How Ideology Makes Smart People Fall for Stupid Ideas (Penguin Random House, 2004)

Why the Left Hates America (Penguin Random House, 2002)

References

External links
 Flynn's webpage
 Author's page at The American Spectator
 

Year of birth missing (living people)
Living people
American political writers
American male writers
American political commentators
American male bloggers
American bloggers
21st-century American non-fiction writers